William John Tobin (28 July 1953 – 7 July 2022) was a British–New Zealand astronomer and academic. In the 2019 United Kingdom general election he stood as an independent candidate against Boris Johnson in the Uxbridge and South Ruislip constituency, gaining five votes. As a non–resident he was ineligible to vote but eligible to stand as a candidate. He focussed his campaign on voting rights using the slogan "Don't vote for Tobin, let Tobin vote".

Early life and education 
Tobin was born in Manchester and attended Stockport Grammar School. He was an undergraduate at Emmanuel College at the University of Cambridge graduating with a degree in natural sciences. He did post-graduate study in astronomy at the University of Wisconsin–Madison where he gained a PhD.

Career 
From 1979 to 1982 Tobin held a postdoctoral lectureship at the University of St Andrews in Scotland and from 1982 to 1987 a position at the Marseille Astrophysics Laboratory. 

In 1987 Tobin became a lecturer in astronomy at the University of Canterbury in Christchurch, New Zealand. He held that position for 19 years until his retirement in 2006. During that time he was also the director of the Mt John University Observatory where he studied the star beta Pictoris. Other areas of research were spectra and photometry of blue stars and eclipsing binary stars in the Magellanic Clouds.

The history of astronomy was another field of Tobin's research. He studied the past Transit of Venus expeditions and wrote a biography of the French physicist Léon Foucault. Tobin's research on telescopes made by James Short found that Otago Museum's telescope was made in 1736 making it the oldest telescope in New Zealand.

Tobin retired to France but continued to work on astronomy projects. He returned to New Zealand in 2008 to take up a visiting Erskine Fellowship at Canterbury, in 2012 to attend the Starlight Conference in Tekapo and the 50th anniversary of the Mt John University Observatory in 2015.

Political candidacy 
Tobin stood as a candidate in the Uxbridge and South Ruislip constituency against Boris Johnson in the 2019 general election. Although he was a British citizen he had not been resident in Britain for more than 15 years making him ineligible to vote in the 2016 Brexit referendum or the general election. Electoral law allowed him to stand as a candidate. He considered that the British electoral system was unfair and used his election platform to highlight the system which disenfranchised expatriate Britons, particularly those living in Europe in the Brexit referendum, foreigners living in the United Kingdom and 16– and 17–year olds. He also promoted electoral reform, particularly proportional representation having observed the change in New Zealand from a First–past–the–post system to Mixed–member proportional representation. Tobin's campaign slogan was "Don't vote Tobin, let Tobin vote". Although he urged voters not to vote for him he received five votes, which was the lowest number of votes for any candidate in the election. He detailed his reasons for standing and his campaign in his book I'm standing!: the story of my candidacy, with advice for future candidates.

Personal life 
Tobin met his French wife Laurence at St Andrews and they had two daughters. He retired to live with his family in Brittany.

Tobin died on 6 July 2022.

Selected works

Books 
 
 Tobin, W. (2003). The life and science of Léon Foucault: the man who proved the earth rotates.
 Tobin, W. (2020). I'm standing!: the story of my candidacy, with advice for future candidates.

Articles 
 Tobin W.; Kaufmann, J. P. (1984). "Analysis of the three high-velocity B stars HD 125924, 165955 and CPD - 72 deg 1184". Monthly Notices of the Royal Astronomical Society. 207: 369–392.
 
 
 
 Tobin, W. (Dec 2016). 'Concerning heritage telescopes' Southern stars. 55 (4): 21–23. 
 Tobin, W. (Jun 2017). 'The Louwman Collection of historic telescopes.' Southern stars. 56 (2): 6–9. 
 
 Tobin, W. (2021). 'Two photograph albums from the German transit of Venus expedition to the Auckland Islands in 1874.' Journal of Astronomical History and Heritage. 24 (3): 823–861. 
 Teaching Antarctic astronomy

References

External links 
 William Tobin's website
 Transit of Venus. Talk on RNZ, 31 May 2012
 William Tobin: the transit of Venus. Talk on RNZ, 2 June 2012

1953 births
2022 deaths
20th-century New Zealand astronomers
21st-century New Zealand astronomers
20th-century British astronomers
21st-century British astronomers
People from Manchester
People educated at Stockport Grammar School
Alumni of Emmanuel College, Cambridge
Alumni of the University of Cambridge
University of Wisconsin–Madison alumni
Academic staff of the University of Canterbury
Independent British political candidates